Le Prêcheur is a village and commune in the French overseas department, region and island of Martinique.

Asthon Tardon (1882-1944), father of Manon Tardon, was mayor of the community; their family's estate was at Anse Couleuvre.

See also
Communes of Martinique
Raphaël Etifier

References

External links

Communes of Martinique
Populated places in Martinique